Andrés de Orbe y Larreategui was the Grand Inquisitor of Spain in 1733–1740, during the reign of  Philip V of Spain.  Afterwards, he held the nunciature in Spain as a representative of the Roman Catholic Popes.

In Philip V promoted de Orbe as Viscount of Santa Cruz in 1733 and as Marquis of Valdespina in 1736. de Orbe also built for his nephew, also Don Andrés,  the Palacio de Valdespina in Ermua, being used today as the Town Hall of this Basque town.

Grand Inquisitors of Spain
Bishops of Barcelona
Archbishops of Valencia
18th-century Roman Catholic archbishops in Spain
Year of birth missing
Year of death missing